Gorkovsky (masculine), Gorkovskaya (feminine), or Gorkovskoye (neuter) is the name of several inhabited localities in Russia.

Modern localities
Urban localities
Gorkovskoye, Omsk Oblast, a work settlement in Gorkovsky District of Omsk Oblast

Rural localities
Gorkovsky, Belgorod Oblast, a settlement in Grayvoronsky District of Belgorod Oblast
Gorkovsky, Samara Oblast, a settlement in Krasnoyarsky District of Samara Oblast
Gorkovsky, Stavropol Krai, a settlement in Gorkovsky Selsoviet of Novoalexandrovsky District of Stavropol Krai
Gorkovsky, Tyoplo-Ogaryovsky District, Tula Oblast, a settlement in Gorkovsky Rural Okrug of Tyoplo-Ogaryovsky District of Tula Oblast
Gorkovsky, Uzlovsky District, Tula Oblast, a settlement in Krasnolesskaya Rural Administration of Uzlovsky District of Tula Oblast
Gorkovskoye, Altai Krai, a selo in Gorkovsky Selsoviet of Shipunovsky District of Altai Krai
Gorkovskoye, Kaliningrad Oblast, a settlement in Kovrovsky Rural Okrug of Zelenogradsky District of Kaliningrad Oblast
Gorkovskoye, Leningrad Oblast, a logging depot settlement in Polyanskoye Settlement Municipal Formation of Vyborgsky District of Leningrad Oblast
Gorkovskoye, Orenburg Oblast, a selo in Gorkovsky Selsoviet of Novoorsky District of Orenburg Oblast
Gorkovskaya, Kirov Oblast, a village in Ichetovkinsky Rural Okrug of Afanasyevsky District of Kirov Oblast
Gorkovskaya, Komi Republic, a village in Vizinga Selo Administrative Territory of Sysolsky District of the Komi Republic

Abolished localities
Gorkovsky, Volgograd Oblast, a former work settlement in Volgograd Oblast; merged into the city of Volgograd in March 2010